Yanbian may refer to:

 Yanbian Korean Autonomous Prefecture, Jilin, China
 Yanbian cattle
 Yanbian County, Sichuan, China